MBC Network News (formerly titled as DZRH Network News) is the flagship Tagalog language tri-media newscast of DZRH. It airs in the Philippines through DZRH News Television every weekday from 12 to 1 p.m. The newscast is being simulcast on 666 kHz in Manila and DZRH provincial relay stations if the station has special coverage.

History

2013-2018: as The Network NewsBreak and MBC Network News
The newscast was launched in October 2013 at the rebrand of RHTV to DZRH News Television with Samantha Nazario, Bea Oranga and Nino Padilla as an 11:00 AM newscast under the name The Network NewsBreak. They were later replaced with the quartet of the main anchor Dennis Antenor, Jr., segment anchors Sonny Casulla, Rocky and primary relief anchor Vien Dacles under the MBC Network News banner in 2014. Initially, Dacles doubled duty as a weather reporter until MBC outsourced weather forecasters from Panahon.TV in 2017.

Initially, the newscast aired on weekdays at 11:00 am and Saturdays at 10:30 am on cable as MBC Network News: Special Edition, both having an 11:30 pm audio-only encore on DZRH-AM and running a half-hour until June 16, 2017, when the weekday edition moved to the prime noon slot and expanded to an hour as a part of daytime revamps. However, the Saturday edition wasn't affected until it was axed by November 25 of that same year in favor of expanding the top-of-the-hour bulletin to Saturdays. The cable-exclusive bulletins continued until June 2019.

As DZRH Network News
On January 8, 2018, coinciding with programming changes on radio, the newscast was reformatted as DZRH Network News and began its simulcast on radio, replacing Rapido Hataw Balita: Alas Dose. Dennis Antenor, Jr. remained at the anchor chair with an expanded involvement from its radio reporters and presented the headlines with emphasis on a "timeline" format, wherein each story carried timepieces depicting the time the news was announced by the station. Network promotional material tagged the newscast as having a different approach from its predecessor. Initially, DZRH-AM simulcast the full hour of the program until March 2018 when it was scaled down to a half-hour to accommodate the radio station's slate of radio dramas; the program itself reduced its run to a half-hour by July 2019.

Changes occurred in April 2018 with Vien Dacles and Sonny Casulla (who later retired and transferred to 87.9 Radyo Biñan) ending on-camera roles and adding in the new segment and relief anchors.

In October 2018, Regi Espiritu replaced Antenor, Jr., as the new anchor as the latter concentrated on his duties as continuity announcer and host of Byaheng RH.

MBC fire and aftermath
On October 2, 2019, the MBC broadcast facilities were affected by a significant fire that originated at the Star City Complex, including the studios utilized by DZRH News Television. Upon the station's temporary relocation to the BSA Twin Towers on October 4, the newscast utilized the DZRH radio booth to ensure the continuation of the broadcast until new studios for the TV simulcast would be finished. However, the programming decision opted for the arrangement to become permanent, reducing its format to a straightforward newscast when DZRH was relocated to the Design Center of the Philippines near the MBC Building on November 11, 2019.

On January 27, 2020, MBC revived MBC Network News albeit as a spun-off, separate newscast exclusively for DZRH News Television, while DZRH Network News remained on the air on both platforms. The former was anchored by the station's international diplomatic reporter Karen Ow-Yong and aired at 11:30-12:00 noon as a lead into the latter until March when DZRH expanded news coverage in view of the enhanced community quarantine in response to COVID-19. As a part of adjustments, DZRH Network News re-expanded to an hour-long noontime newscast while MBC Network News moved to a late-evening broadcast. Both editions continued airing under this arrangement until August 28, 2020.

2020-2021: Unified branding
On August 31, 2020, MBC Network News was relaunched and returned as DZRH's noontime news program while retiring the "DZRH Network News" brand. Its original anchor, Dennis Antenor, Jr. returned as the main presenter with Atty. Cherryl Adami-Molina, who formerly served as co-anchor for DZRH Happy Hour in the same capacity. The reformat is a result of the move of Dos por Dos and its hosts Anthony Taberna and Gerry Baja to DZRH and replacing Happy Hour at the 5:00 pm timeslot. On the same day, MBC Network News expanded to include an evening edition, anchored by Rey Sibayan and DZRH Evening News holdover Raymond Dadpaas at 6:30 pm. The late-night edition was also carried over but reformatted to concentrate exclusively on provincial reports.

Under this format, the noontime edition is broadcast from the DZRH News Television TV studio as an hour-long newscast on cable with its first half-hour simulcast on the radio (similar to its predecessor). In contrast, its evening edition is broadcast hour-long on all platforms and produced from the DZRH radio studio. The late-night edition is broadcast on all platforms in full from the RHTV studio.

Reverted as Noontime Newscast
On May 3, 2021, the late-night edition of the newscast was retitled DZRH Correspondents, still presented by Karen Ow-Yong and retained on provincial reports, even though the "MBC Network News" brand is still utilized on its headlines. Meanwhile, the evening edition was replaced by the new radio program Dos Kumpanyeras, where Atty. Cherryl Adami-Molina is one of the hosts, leaving Dennis Antenor, Jr. as the sole anchor of the noontime edition.

On January 10, 2022, the news program went on hiatus on DZRH TV due to the implementation of health protocols caused by COVID-19. It was temporarily replaced by the replay of Metro Manila Ngayon, also hosted by Antenor, Jr. The news program later resumed its broadcast a week after.

Dennis Antenor, Jr. silently left the newscast, as well as the entire network, Manila Broadcasting Company on May 24, 2022. He was replaced by Edniel Parrosa as the main anchor of the newscast.

Segments
DZRH Showbiz Spotted - entertainment news
Match Point - sports news
Balitang Abroad - foreign news
From the Files of TNVS - trending issues
Regional News - provincial news
 Expert's Opinion - a guest's take on a topic at hand
 Mother Knows Best - tips about motherhood
 Hoy, Bawal 'Yan! - discussion of legal issues
 Alamin Na This - tips about anything about public documents
 The Better News - human interest stories

Current presenter

Main anchors
 RH 55 - Edniel Parrosa
 Angelica Cosme (TNVS, Legal Minds and DZRH-TV Showbiz Spotted segment anchor)
 CD Argarin (Expert's Opinion and Match Point segment anchor)
 Pamela Adriano (Alamin Na This segment anchor; fill-in anchor)

Segment anchors
 Jecelle Fulgencio-Ricafort (general assignments)
 Elaine Apit (The Better News)
 Thea Pecho Corpuz (Mother Knows Best)
 Atty. Cherryl Adami-Molina (Hoy, Bawal 'Yan!)

Field unit reporters
 RH 03 - Regi Espiritu
 RH 04 - Karen Ow-Yong (Foreign Affairs beat)
 RH 05 - Val Gonzales (Police beat)
 RH 06 - Sherwin Alfaro (Southern Metro Manila)
 RH 07 - Henry Uri (Education and Office of the Vice President beat)
 RH 08 - Christian Maño (general assignments)
 RH 12 - Milky Rigonan (Congress beat)
 RH 13 - Mae Binauhan
 RH 14 - Leth Narciso (Malacañang Palace beat)
 RH 17 - Nicole Lopez
 RH 18 - Ruel Saldico (Bicol Region)
 RH 19 - Jun Dimacutac (Central Mindanao)
 RH 23 - Edwin Duque (CAMANAVA and Quezon City)
 RH 25 - Grace Vera-Sansano (Central Luzon stringer)
 RH 27 - Noche Cacas
 RH 28 - Raymond Dadpaas (Senate beat)
 RH 29 - Boy Gonzales (Roving/Manila)
 RH 30 - Liezel Once
 RH 31 - Gary Libunao (Cagayan Valley reporter)
 RH 32 - Jimmy Angay-angay (Tacloban City)
 RH 33 - Benjamin Antioquia (Lucena City)
 RH 34 - Jayne Galit-Bantayan (Catarman, Northern Samar)
 RH 35 - Renz Belda (Batangas)
 RH 36 - Dennis Alipio (Laoag)
 RH 37 - Danny Cumilang (Bataan)
 RH 38 - Freddie Fajardo (Pangasinan)
 RH 39 - Aine Grace Bañaria-Bravo (Iloilo City)
 RH 40 - Jhun Suter (Deputy Davao City - also with Aksyon Radyo Davao)
 RH 41 - Romy Gonzales (Baguio)
 RH 46 - Rex Cantong (Bacolod - also with Aksyon Radyo Bacolod)
 RH 47 - Morly Alino
 RH 52 - Jun Alegre (Deputy Bicol reporter - Legazpi, Albay)
 RH 54 - Mavel Arive

Former presenters

Inaugural
 Niño "Bonito" Padilla (now at DZRB-AM's Cabinet Report)
 Bea Oranga
 Samantha Nazario

Post-2014
 Vien Dacles
 Sonny Casula
 Shiela Edubas
 Rita Salonga
 Kristine dela Cruz
 Florante Rosales
 Victor de Guzman

2020 Unified Branding
 Atty. Cherryl Adami-Molina (Noontime edition)
 RH 11 - Rey Sibayan (Evening edition)
 RH 28 - Raymond Dadpaas (Evening edition)
 RH 04 - Karen Ow-Yong (Late-night edition)
 RH 42 - Dennis Antenor, Jr. (Noontime edition) (now with Aliw Broadcasting Corporation)
 RH 43 - Rocky (Showbiz)
 Peache Gonzales (formerly with 104.7 Brigada News FM; general assignments)
 Christhel Cuazon (weather)

See also
DZRH News Television
List of programs broadcast by DZRH/DZRH News Television

Manila Broadcasting Company
Philippine television news shows
2013 Philippine television series debuts
Filipino-language television shows